Seacole is an English surname. Notable people with the surname include:

Jason Seacole (born 1960), English footballer
Mary Seacole (1805–1881), British-Jamaican nurse, healer, and businesswoman

English-language surnames